Carl M. Cannon (born 1953) is an American journalist who, as of 2022, is the executive editor and Washington, D.C. bureau chief of RealClearPolitics.

Cannon was born in California and graduated from the University of Colorado. He worked as a reporter in Petersburg, Virginia, Columbus, Georgia, and at The San Diego Tribune newspaper, and later the San Jose Mercury News, the Baltimore Sun, and the National Journal before being hired by RealClearPolitics in 2011. At the San Jose Mercury News he was part of the reporting team that was awarded the 1990 Pulitzer Prize in the category of general news reporting for coverage of the Loma Prieta earthquake. In 2003 he was elected president of the White House Correspondents Association. He has also served as a Fellow-in-Residence at the Harvard University Institute of Politics. Cannon is a recipient of the Aldo Beckman Award for Journalistic Excellence.

He is the son of Lou Cannon.

Bibliography

References

External links

Living people
University of Colorado Boulder alumni
American political journalists
1953 births
The Baltimore Sun people